Börje-Bengt Hedblom was a Swedish bobsledder who competed from the early 1950s to the early 1960s. He won a bronze medal in the four-man event at the 1961 FIBT World Championships in Lake Placid, New York.

References
Bobsleigh four-man world championship medalists since 1930

Year of death missing
Swedish male bobsledders
Year of birth missing
20th-century Swedish people